The posterior median sulcus is the posterior end of the posterior median septum of neuroglia  of the spinal cord. The septum varies in depth from 4 to 6 mm, but diminishes considerably in the lower part of the spinal cord.

References

External links
 

Spinal cord